Stehag is a locality situated in Eslöv Municipality, Skåne County, Sweden with 1,261 inhabitants as of 2018. The medieval Stehag Church contains early medieval mural paintings.

References 

Populated places in Eslöv Municipality
Populated places in Skåne County